In enzymology, a vitamin-K-epoxide reductase (warfarin-sensitive) is an enzyme that catalyzes the chemical reaction

2-methyl-3-phytyl-1,4-naphthoquinone + oxidized dithiothreitol  2,3-epoxy-2,3-dihydro-2-methyl-3-phytyl-1,4-naphthoquinone + 1,4-dithiothreitol

Thus, the two substrates of this enzyme are 2-methyl-3-phytyl-1,4-naphthoquinone and oxidized dithiothreitol, whereas its two products are 2,3-epoxy-2,3-dihydro-2-methyl-3-phytyl-1,4-naphthoquinone and 1,4-dithiothreitol.

This enzyme belongs to the family of oxidoreductases, specifically those acting on the CH or CH2 groups of donor with a disulfide as acceptor.  The systematic name of this enzyme class is 2-methyl-3-phytyl-1,4-naphthoquinone:oxidized-dithiothreitol oxidoreductase. This enzyme participates in biosynthesis of steroids.  At least one compound, Warfarin is known to inhibit this enzyme.

References 

 
 
 

EC 1.17.4
Enzymes of unknown structure